Big Star Records is a  music retailer that was based in Adelaide, South Australia. It currently has the original store on Magill Rd, Norwood, South Australia.

From the 1980s until March 2010, Big Star Records also operated a retail store on Rundle Street, which closed when sales dropped due to competition from online music purchases.

History
Big Star was founded in 
1988 by  Andy Geue  , and began as a second hand shop on Magill Road in Norwood, South Australia. .

At its height, Big Star had six outlets in Adelaide, including the central store in Rundle Street in the East End. The Rundle Street store hosted free gigs in the basement every Wednesday evening, and many in-store appearances by bands such as Blink-182, Regurgitator and They Might Be Giants.

See also

References

Music retailers of Australia